Berezhok is a rural locality (a village) in Semizerye Rural Settlement, Kaduysky District, Vologda Oblast, Russia. The population was 17 as of 2002.

Geography 
Berezhok is located 66 km northwest of Kaduy (the district's administrative centre) by road. Sosnovka is the nearest rural locality.

References 

Rural localities in Kaduysky District